is the 29th studio album by Japanese singer-songwriter Miyuki Nakajima, released in September 2001.

As a follow-up to a double A-Side single "Earthly Stars (Unsung Heroes)"/"Headlight, Taillight", Lullaby for the Soul was greeted with relatively high anticipation. It debuted at No. 3 on the Oricon chart in its first week (highest position since her 1996 compilation Daiginjyō which became her last No. 1 hit), although it quickly fell off the top 100 with physical sales of less than 100,000 copies in total. A music video of the opening track was produced to promote the album, and it was later issued on compilation DVD Utahime: Live in L.A. in 2004.

Track listing
All songs written by Miyuki Nakajima, arranged by Ichizō Seo.
"" – 3:39
"" – 5:33
"" – 6:22
"" – 4:30
"" – 5:19
"" – 5:23
"" – 4:33
"" – 4:48
"" – 6:26
"" – 5:00
 "Lovers Only" – 5:47

Personnel
 Miyuki Nakajima – vocals
 Ichizō Seo – keyboards
 Vinnie Colaiuta – drums
 Russ Kunkel – drums
 Michael Thompson – electric guitar
 Masayoshi Furukawa – electric guitar
 Tomō Sato – acoustic guitar
 Tim Pierce – electric guitar, flat mandolin
 Neil Stubenhaus – electric bass
 Leland Sklar – electric bass
 Jon Gilutin – acoustic piano, electric piano, strings pad, hammond B-3
 Shingo Kobayashi – keyboards
 Elton Nagata – keyboards
 Joe Stone – oboe
 Steve Richards – cello
 Keishi Urata – computer programming
 Seiichi Takubo – computer programming
 Julia Waters – backing vocals
 Maxine Waters – backing vocals
 Oren Waters – backing vocals
 Naoki Takao – backing vocals
 Yasuhiro Kido – backing vocals
 Kiyoshi Hiyama – backing vocals
 Junko Hirotani – backing vocals
 Taeko Saitō – backing vocals
 Kayoko Wada – backing vocals

Production
 Producer and Arranger: Ichizo Seo
 Composer, Writer, Producer and Performer: Miyuki Nakajima
 Engineer and Mixer: David Thoener, Joe Chiccarelli
 Assistant Engineer: Robert Road, Tim Lauber, Chiaki Kudō
 Mixer: Rob Jacobs
 A&R: Yoshio Kan
 Assistant: Tim Lauber, Errin Familia, Andy Ackland
 Assistant for Producer: Tomo Satō
 Promoter: Ryuta Yonezawa
 Artist Promotor: Mio Moriwaki
 Sales Promotor: Takehiko Kudō 
 Production Coordinator: Ryō Yoneya
 Recording Coordinator: Takashi Kimura, Fumio Miyata, Tomoko Takaya, Ruriko Duer、Norio Yamamoto
 L.A. Studio Musicians Contractor: Suzie Katayama 
 Photographer and Art Director: Jin Tamura
 Designer: Hirofumi Arai
 Costume: Takeshi Hazama
 Hair and Make-up: Noriko Izumisawa
 Artist Management: Kohji Suzuki, Kohichi Okazaki
 Assistant: Fumie Ohshima
 General Producer: Shosuke Hasegawa
 General Affairs: Atsuko Hayashi, Aya Ninomiya
 Special Thanks to Kiyoshi Yada, John Hisamoto Akira Hayashi
Mastered by Tom Baker at Precision Mastering, Los Angeles

Chart positions

References

Miyuki Nakajima albums
2001 albums